Into the Gap is the fourth studio album by British pop group Thompson Twins, released on 17 February 1984 by Arista Records. The album was recorded during 1983 at Compass Point Studios, in Nassau, Bahamas, and was produced by Alex Sadkin who had produced the band's previous studio album, Quick Step & Side Kick (1983).

Despite a mixed response from critics, Into the Gap became the band's most commercially successful studio album, peaking at number one on the UK Albums Chart (for three weeks), and number 10 on the US Billboard 200. "Hold Me Now", "Doctor! Doctor!", "You Take Me Up", and "Sister of Mercy" were all released as singles in the UK with corresponding music videos. Three of the four singles that were released in the UK made the Top 5 and the fourth just missed the Top 10. "The Gap" was also released as a single in some other countries, but no video was made for it. According to the RIAA, the record sold over one million copies in the US; in the UK the album sold over 600,000 copies and was certified 2× platinum. It became one of the year's biggest sellers, with five million copies sold worldwide. The band embarked on a world tour in support of the album.

In March 2008, Into the Gap was reissued as an expanded 2-disc set by Edsel Records. It included the bonus cassette remixes that originally appeared on the original cassette version of the album in 1984, and also features a second disc which includes most major 12" single versions and B-sides, some of which appear on CD for the first time.

Critical reception

Writing in Smash Hits magazine, Dave Rimmer gave the album 2.5 out of 10, commenting that it contained "several songs with empty words and plodding tunes sung in a whiney voice and slung together with fake sentiment. The success of the terrible Twins represents the usual triumph of naked ambition over talent." In his consumer guide for The Village Voice, Robert Christgau admired the track "Hold Me Now", and gave the album a B−, but commented that "Nothing else here approaches its heart-tugging mastery, but the album remains lightly creditable through the title-cut chinoiserie which opens side two. After that, as Alannah Currie herself puts it, who can stop the rain?". Keith Sharp of Music Express wrote "Into The Gap could be perceived as a distinctive milestone on how far new music has come in the past few years. It's enough to make you forget that the old dinosaur bands ever existed." J. D. Considine of Musician wrote "At times, the gimmicks can be as slight as a synthesizer setting, but they invariable make the album seem dazzling even when it isn't." However, NME called them "1984's most instantly kitsch mass program of monosodium glutamation of the brain".

A more recent review from Jose F. Promis of AllMusic gave the album four out of five stars and wrote that "Nearly every song on this set differed from the others, with each track taking the listener on a different musical journey." adding that "[the] Thompson Twins were quiet visionaries, blending intelligent lyrics, Eastern sensibilities, and new wave pop to create a wholly unique and unforgettable listening experience and an album that ranks as one of the '80s' most unique."

Track listing

Personnel
Thompson Twins
 Tom Bailey – vocals, synthesizers, pianos, guitars, bass guitar, double bass, melodica, harmonica, drum programming
 Joe Leeway – synthesizers, congas, backing vocals
 Alannah Currie – acoustic drums, percussion, marimba, xylophone, backing vocals

Additional musicians
 Pandit Dinesh – tablas on "The Gap"

Production
 Tom Bailey – producer
 Alex Sadkin – producer, engineer
 Phil Thornalley – recording, mixing 
 Chris Dickie –  assistant engineer 
 Frank Gibson – assistant engineer 
 Steve Dewey – assistant engineer 
 Ted Jensen – mastering
 Alannah Currie – art direction 
 Nick Marchant – art direction
 Satari Graphic – design 
 Paul Cox – front cover photography 
 Peter Ashworth – inside photography

Studios
 Recorded at Compass Point Studios (Nassau, Bahamas).
 Mixed at RAK Studios (London, UK).
 Mastered at Sterling Sound (New York City, New York, USA).

Charts

Weekly charts

Year-end charts

Certifications

References

Bibliography

External links

1984 albums
Albums produced by Alex Sadkin
Arista Records albums
Thompson Twins albums